The Rheingau Musik Festival is an annual international summer music festival in Germany, founded in 1987. It is mostly dedicated to classical music, but includes other genres. Concerts take place at culturally important locations in the wine-growing Rheingau region between Wiesbaden and Lorch.

References

External links 

 Rheingau Musik Festival Rheingau Musik Festival

Buildings and structures in Rheingau-Taunus-Kreis
Tourist attractions in Hesse
Rheingau